Demania is a genus of crabs in the family Xanthidae, containing the following species:

 Demania alcocki Deb, 1987
 Demania armadillus (Herbst, 1790)
 Demania baccalipes (Alcock, 1898)
 Demania crosnieri Serene, 1984
 Demania cultripes (Alcock, 1898)
 Demania garthi Guinot & Richer de Forges, 1981
 Demania intermedia Guinot, 1969
 Demania japonica Guinot, 1977
 Demania mortenseni (Odhner, 1925)
 Demania reynaudi (H. Milne Edwards, 1834)
 Demania rotundata Serene, 1969
 Demania scaberrima (Walker, 1887)
 Demania serenei Guinot & Richer de Forges, 1981
 Demania splendida Laurie, 1906
 Demania toxica Garth, 1971
 Demania unispinosa Chen & Ng, 1999
 Demania wardi Garth & Ng, 1985

Many of the species are known to be toxic to humans and domestic animals, and it is thought likely that all species of Demania are toxic.

References

Xanthoidea